The Welsh Dragon was a named passenger train operating in the United Kingdom.

History
The service was introduced in December 2004 by Virgin Trains between London Euston and Holyhead. The 5.38am service from Holyhead with a return from Euston at 5.21pm was given the name.

By 2017 the name had fallen out of use.

References

Virgin Trains
Railway services introduced in 2004
2004 establishments in England
Named passenger trains of the United Kingdom